Taare Zameen Par, also known as Like Stars on Earth in English, is a 2007 Indian Hindi-language drama film produced and directed by Aamir Khan. The film stars Khan himself, along with Darsheel Safary, Tanay Chheda, Sachet Engineer, Vipin Sharma and Tisca Chopra. The film explores the life and imagination of Ishaan (Safary), a 9-year-old boy who, despite excelling in art, has poor academic performance which leads his parents to send him to a boarding school, where a new art teacher Nikumbh (Khan) suspects that he is dyslexic and helps him to overcome his reading disorder.

Creative director and writer Amole Gupte initially developed the idea with his wife Deepa Bhatia, who served as the film's editor. Shankar–Ehsaan–Loy composed the film's score, and Prasoon Joshi wrote the lyrics for many of the songs. Principal photography took place in Mumbai and in Panchgani's New Era High School, and some of the school's students make appearances.

Taare Zameen Par made its theatrical debut in India on 21 December 2007, earning 1.35 billion worldwide, thus proving to be a commercial success. It received widespread critical acclaim, with praise for its novel story, screenplay, direction, dialogues, soundtrack and performances of the cast. The film also proved to be vital in raising awareness about dyslexia.

A recipient of several accolades, Taare Zameen Par was India's official entry at the 81st Academy Awards for Best Foreign Film, but did not proceed further. At the 55th National Film Awards, it won 3 awards – Best Film on Family Welfare, Best Lyrics (Prasoon Joshi for "Maa") and Best Male Playback Singer (Shankar Mahadevan for "Maa"). At the 53rd Filmfare Awards, it received a leading 11 nominations, including Best Actor (Safary), Best Supporting Actor (Aamir Khan) and Best Supporting Actress (Chopra), and won a leading 5 awards, including Best Film, Best Director (Aamir Khan) and Best Lyricist (Joshi for "Maa"). 

UTV Home Entertainment released a DVD for Indian audiences in 2008. Disney's later release of the international edition DVD marked the first purchase of distribution rights for an Indian film by a global company.

Plot 
Ishaan Awasthi is an 8-year-old boy who has trouble following school, though he is assumed by all to hate learning, and is belittled for it. His imagination, creativity, and talent for art and painting are often disregarded. His father, Nandkishore is a successful executive who expects his sons to excel, and his mother, Maya is a homemaker who is frustrated by her inability to educate Ishaan. Ishaan's elder brother, Yohan is an exemplary student in whose shadow Ishaan remains. One day, Ishaan and his parents are called by Ishaan's principal to discuss his failures in class. Fed up of hearing Ishaan's failures and lack of improvement, Nandkishore sends Ishaan to a boarding school. Alone there, he rapidly sinks into a state of fear, anxiety, and depression, which is only worsened by the teachers there and their strict and abusive regime. His only friend is Rajan Damodaran, a physically disabled boy who is one of the top students and resides with his family there, as his father is part of the school's board. Ishaan contemplates suicide one day, but Rajan prevents him.

Ram Shankar Nikumbh, a cheerful and optimistic instructor at the Tulips School for young children with developmental disabilities, joins the boarding school's faculty the same day, replacing the authoritarian Mr. Holkar, the school's former art teacher. Ram's teaching style is markedly different from that of Holkar's, and he quickly notes Ishaan's unhappiness that day after he fails to draw anything during the class. He reviews Ishaan's work and concludes that his academic shortcomings are indicative of dyslexia. Ram then visits the Ishaan's house in Mumbai, where he is surprised to discover Ishaan's hidden interest in art. Flustered, he demonstrates to Maya and Yohan how Ishaan has extreme difficulty in understanding letters and words due to dyslexia, and his poverty in sports skills stems from his poor motor ability. Nandkishore labels it as an intellectual disability and dismisses it as laziness.

Back at school, Ram brings up the topic of dyslexia in a class by offering a list of famous dyslexic people. He comforts Ishaan, telling him how he struggled as a child as well. Ram obtains the principal's permission to become Ishaan's tutor. With gradual care, he works to improve Ishaan's reading and writing by using remedial techniques developed by dyslexia specialists. Eventually, both Ishaan's demeanor and his grades improve. One day Nandkishore visits the school and tells Ram that he and Maya have read up on dyslexia and understand the condition. Ram mentions that what Ishaan needs more than understanding is that someone loves him. Outside Nandkishore sees Ishaan reading from a board. With teary eyes, he is unable to face his son and walks away.

At the end of the school year, Ram organises an arts and crafts contest for the staff and students, judged by artist Lalita Lajmi. Ishaan's work makes him the winner and Ram, who paints Ishaan's portrait, is declared the runner-up. The principal announces that Ram has been hired as the school's permanent art teacher. When Ishaan's parents meet his teachers on the last day of school, they are left speechless by the transformation in him. Overcome with emotion, Nandkishore thanks Ram. Before leaving, Ishaan runs toward Ram, who lifts him high up in a hug.

Cast 

 Darsheel Safary as Ishaan Nandkishore Awasthi (Inu): Maya & Nandkishore's son 
 Veer Mohan as Little Ishaan
 Aamir Khan as Ram Shankar Nikumbh: An art teacher at New Era High School and Inu's tutor 
 Tisca Chopra as Maya Awasthi: Ishaan and Yohaan's mother 
 Vipin Sharma as Nandkishore Awasthi, Ishaan and Yohaan's father 
 Tanay Chheda as Rajan Damodran, Inu's best friend and classmate at boarding school
 Sachet Engineer as Yohaan Nandkishore Awasthi: Inu's brother
 Aniket Engineer as Junior Yohaan
 Ramit Gupta as Ranjeet
 Girija Oak as Jabeen Khan: Nikumbh's co-worker
 Bugs Bhargava and Shankar Sachdev as Sen Sir and Tiwari Sir, Two teachers at New Era High School 
 M. K. Raina as Principal - Boarding school: The head of New Era High School
 Pratima Kulkarni as Principal - St. Anthony's School
 Meghna Malik as Victoria Teacher: Class and math teacher of Ishaan's former school, St. Anthony's School
 Sonali Sachdev as Irene Teacher: An English teacher at Ishaan's former school, St. Anthony's School
 Lalita Lajmi as herself (cameo appearance)
 Abhishek Bachchan as himself (cameo appearance in photograph)

Production

Development 
The husband and wife team of Amole Gupte and Deepa Bhatia developed the story that would eventually become Taare Zameen Par as a way of understanding why some children cannot conform to a conventional educational system. Their initial work began as a short story that evolved into a screenplay over seven years. Deepa Bhatia stated in an interview with The Hindu that her original inspiration was the childhood of Japanese filmmaker Akira Kurosawa, who did poorly in school. Her goal was to explore the story of "a child who did not fit into the school stream." She referenced a specific moment in Kurosawa's biography where he began to excel after meeting an attentive art teacher, and noted that this scene "became the inspiration for how a teacher could transform the life of a student".

While developing the character of a young boy based on Kurosawa, Bhatia and Gupte explored some possible reasons why he failed in school. Their research led them to the Maharashtra Dyslexia Association and Parents for a Better Curriculum for the Child (PACE). Dyslexia eventually became the central topic and theme of the film. The pair worked with dyslexic children to research and develop the screenplay, basing characters and situations on their observations. Bhatia and Gupte carefully concealed the children's identities in the final version of the script.

Khan and Gupte first met in college. Khan has said that he admired Gupte's abilities as an actor, writer, and painter. Three years before the film's release, Gupte brought Khan to the project as a producer and actor. Gupte himself was to direct, but the first week's dailies were a great disappointment to Khan, who "lost faith in Amole and his capability of translating on screen what he had so beautifully written on paper". Khan was on the verge of withdrawing his participation in the film because of these "creative differences", but Gupte kept him on board by stepping down as director. Contrary to Khan's claim, Gupte lashed out saying that after the wrap-up party, Khan announced that he was the director of the film, despite Gupte acting as director. Had it been necessary to hire a third party, production would have been postponed for 6–8 months as the new director prepared for the film. Keen to keep Safary as Ishaan—the actor might have aged too much for the part had production been delayed—Khan took over the role of director. Taare Zameen Par was Khan's first experience in the dual role of actor and director. He has admitted that the transition was challenging, stating that while he had always wanted to direct a film, it was unknown territory for him. Gupte remained on set, "guiding [Khan] and, at times, even correcting [him]".

Title and translation 
Initially, the film was to retain the short story's title of "High Jump", which referenced Ishaan's inability to achieve the high jump in gym class. This subplot, which was filmed but later cut, would have tied into the original ending for the movie. In this planned ending, a "ghost image" separates from Ishaan after the art competition and runs to the sports field; the film would end on a freeze frame of Ishaan's "ghost image" successfully making the leap. Aamir Khan disliked this proposed ending and convinced Gupte to rewrite it.

With the working title no longer relevant, Khan, Gupte, and Bhatia discussed several alternatives, eventually deciding on Taare Zameen Par. Possible translations of this title include Stars on the Ground and Like Stars on Earth. According to Khan:

Filming 
Principal photography for the film took place in India over five months. Khan spent his first two days as director blocking the first scene to be filmed—Ishaan returning home from school and putting away his recently collected fish—and becoming comfortable with his new responsibilities. Believing that the audience should not be aware of the camera, he chose a simple shooting style for the film that involved relatively little camera movement.

At the same time, Khan also made use of illusory camera tricks. For example, the opening scene of Ishaan collecting fish outside his school was shot on location and at Film City. Shots focusing on Ishaan took place at the former, while those involving the gutter terrarium were filmed at a water tank at the latter. The tank's water often became murky because the mud would rise to the top, forcing production to constantly empty and refill it. Due to this hindrance, the scene took eight hours to film. The film's next sequence involved Ishaan playing with two dogs. To compensate for the "absolutely petrified" Safary, most joint shots used a body double, though other portions integrated close-up shots of the actor. Ishaan's nightmare—he becomes separated from his mother at a train station and she departs on a train while he is trapped in a crowd—was filmed in Mumbai on a permanent railway-station set. To work around the train set piece's immobility, production placed the camera on a moving trolley to create the illusion of a departing train. For the sequences related from the mother's point of view—shot from behind the actress—Chopra stood on a trolley next to a recreated section of the train's door.

All the school sequences were filmed on location. The production team searched for a Mumbai school with an "oppressive" feel to establish the "heaviness of being in a metropolitan school", and eventually chose St. Xavier's School. As the school is situated along a main road filming took place on weekends, to minimise the background noise, but an early scene in which Ishaan is sent out of the classroom was filmed on the day of the Mumbai Marathon. The production staff placed acrylic sheets invisible to the naked eye on the classroom windows to mask the sounds of nearby crowds and helicopters. New Era High School served as Ishaan's boarding school. The change of setting was a "breath of fresh air" for the production crew, who moved from Ishaan's small house in Mysore Colony, Chembur to the "vast, beautiful environs" of Panchgani.

Production relied on stock footage for the brief scene of a bird feeding its babies. Khan carefully selected a clip to his liking, but learned three weeks before the film's release that the footage was not available in the proper format. With three days to replace it or else risk delaying the release, Khan made do with what he could find. He says that he "cringes" every time he sees it.

Children 
Real schoolchildren participated throughout the movie's filming. Khan credited them with the film's success, and was reportedly very popular with them. Furthermore, Khan placed a high priority on the day-to-day needs of his child actors, and went to great lengths to attend to them. The production staff made sure that the students were never idle, and always kept them occupied outside of filming. New Era Faculty Coordinator Douglas Lee thought the experience not only helped the children to learn patience and co-operation, but also gave them a better understanding of how they should behave towards children like Ishaan who have problems in school. Because filming at New Era High School occurred during the winter holiday, those portraying Ishaan's classmates gave up their vacation to participate. To fill in the campus background, students from nearby schools were also brought in. A total of 1,500 children were used for wide-shots of the film's art-fair climax; medium shots only required 400 students.

New to acting, the children often made errors such as staring into the camera, and Khan resorted to unorthodox methods to work around their rookie mistakes. For example, an early scene in the film featured a school assembly; Khan wanted the students to act naturally and to ignore the principal's speech, but recognised that this would be a difficult feat with cameras present. First Assistant Director Sunil Pandey spoke continuously in an attempt to "bore the hell out of [them]", and they eventually lost interest in the filming and behaved normally. A later scene involved Nikumbh enlightening his class about famous people with dyslexia, and the children's responses to his speech were the last portion to be filmed. Having already spent 3–4 days hearing the dialogue the children's reactions were "jaded". Khan opted to film them while he recited a tale, and manipulated his storytelling to achieve the varying spontaneous reactions. The following scene had the children playing around a nearby pond.

Khan found it important that the audience connect the film to real children, and had Pandey travel throughout India filming documentary-style footage of children from all walks of life. Those visuals were integrated into the end credits.

Art and animation 
While claymation has been used in Indian television commercials, the film's title sequence—a representation of Ishaan's imagination—marked its first instance in a Bollywood film. Khan gave claymation artist Dhimant Vyas free rein over the various elements. The storyboarding took one and a half months and the shooting required 15 days. The "3 into 9" sequence, in which Ishaan delves into his imagination to solve a math problem, was originally conceived as a 3D animation. Halfway through its creation, however, Khan felt it was not turning out as he had envisioned it. Khan scrapped the project and hired Vaibhav Kumaresh, who hand-drew the scene as a 2D animation.

Artist Samir Mondal composed Ishaan and Nikumbh's art-fair watercolor paintings. He held a workshop with the schoolchildren, and incorporated elements from their artwork into Ishaan's. Mondal also instructed Khan on a painter's typical mannerisms and movements. Gupte created the rest of Ishaan's artwork and Assistant Art Director Veer Nanavati drew Ishaan's flipbook. The art department's designs for Ishaan's school notebooks disappointed Khan, who had familiarized himself with dyslexic writing. Using his left hand, Khan instead wrote it himself.

Musical sequences 
The musical sequence of "Jame Raho" establishes the characters of the four members of Ishaan's family; for example, the father is hardworking and responsible, and Yohaan is an "ideal son" who does all the right things. A robotic style of music overlaps most of the sequence—this is mirrored by the machine-like morning routines of the mother, father, and Yohaan—but changes for Ishaan's portion to imply that he is different from the rest. This concept is furthered by speed ramping and having the camera sway with the music to create a distinct style. The twilight scenes of "Maa" were a particular issue for the production crew. Because the specific lighting only lasted ten to fifteen minutes a day, the scenes took nearly ten evenings to film. Production at one time considered having a child singing, but ultimately deemed it too over the top and felt it would connect to more people if sung by an adult. Shankar initially performed the song as a sample—they planned to replace him with another singer—but production eventually decided that his rendition was best.

Ishaan's truancy scene—he leaves school one day after realizing that his mother has not signed his failed math test—originally coincided with the song "Kholo Kholo," but Khan did not believe it worked well for the situation. In his opinion, the accompanying song should focus on what a child wants—to be free—and be told from the first-person perspective instead of "Kholo Kholos second person. When Khan took over as director, he opted to use "Mera Jahan"—a song written by Gupte—and moved "Kholo Kholo" to the art fair. Viewers of test screenings were divided over the truancy scene. Half thoroughly enjoyed it but the rest complained that it was too long, did not make sense, and merely showed "touristy" visuals of Mumbai. Khan nevertheless kept the scene, because he "connected deeply" with it and felt that it established Ishaan's world.

Shiamak Davar choreographed the dance sequence of "Bum Bum Bole," and was given free rein over its design. He had intended to use 40 students from his dance school, but Khan did not want trained dancers. Davar gave the children certain cues and a general idea of what to do, but left the style and final product up to them to avoid a choreographed appearance. Time constraints meant that while Khan was busy filming "Bum Bum Bole," Ram Madhvani took over as director for "Bheja Kum". The latter sequence, containing a "fun-filled" song of rhythmic dialogue, allowed the audience to perceive how Ishaan sees the world and written languages. It was intended to represent "a young boy's worst nightmare, in terms of ... the worst thing that he can think of"; Madhvani based the visual concept on his son's fear of "creepy-crawlies" such as cockroaches, dragonflies, and lizards. Tata Elxsi's Visual Computing Labs made the creatures out of the English alphabet and numbers, although Khan insisted they include the Hindi alphabet as not all the audience would be familiar with English. The chalkboard writing's transformation into a snake was included to surprise the audience and "end the song on a high note."

In writing the song "Taare Zameen Par," lyricist Prasoon Joshi followed the theme of "however much you talk about children, it's not enough." Every line throughout the song describes children, and only one repeats: "Kho Naa Jaaye Yeh / Taare Zameen Par" ("Let us not lose these / Little stars on earth"). The song is mostly set to the annual day performance by the developmentally disabled children of Tulips School. Actual students from Tulips School and Saraswati Mandir participated, and were filmed over a period of five days. The sequence originally featured numerous dance performances, but was trimmed down when test audiences found it too long. A song accompanying the scene in which Ishaan's mother is watching home videos of her son was also cut, and replaced with background music after test audiences expressed their opposition to yet another song.

Background music 

Timing and other aspects are usually planned when scoring a film, but Khan chose to take a more improvised approach. Instead of using a studio, he and the trio Shankar–Ehsaan–Loy recorded it at Khan's home in Panchgani, to clear their heads and not be in the mindset of the city. As they watched the film, Khan pointed out when he wanted music to begin and of what type. Ehsaan Noorani noted that this strategy allowed the score to have a "spontaneity to it."

Different styles of background music were used to convey certain things. For example, a guitar is played when Ishaan is tense or upset, sometimes with discordant notes. The music of the opening scene—the recurring "Ishaan's Theme," which represents the character's peace of mind—overpowers the background noise to show that Ishaan is lost in his own world; the noise becomes louder after he snaps back to reality. But the scene in which Nikumbh explains dyslexia to Ishaan's family took the opposite approach. Silent at first, the music is slowly introduced as the father begins to understand his son's dilemma. The almost seven-minute long scene scarcely used any background music, to slow the pace and make it seem more realistic.

Promotional material 
When filming part of the montage that details Ishaan's tutoring by Nikumbh, Khan immediately decided it would be the "key art of the film". He noted that "this one shot tells you the entire story", and used it for the poster.

Release

Box office 
Taare Zameen Par was released worldwide on 14 December 2007, although countries such as Australia, Malaysia, New Zealand, and Fiji opened it on 20 December. It debuted in India with 425 prints, although revenue-sharing issues between the film's distributors and theatre owners caused some slight delays. The movie grossed  domestically within the first three days. Its theatre occupancy in Mumbai dropped to 58 percent during its third week, but climbed back to 62 percent the following week—this brought the total to —after the Maharashtra government granted the film exemption from the entertainment tax. Anticipating further tax exemption in other states, world distributor PVR Pictures circulated 200 more prints of the film. The film completed its domestic run with $19,779,215. To reach more audiences, the film was later dubbed in the regional languages of Tamil and Telugu. Both were scheduled for release on 12 September 2008, the former under the title Vaalu Nakshatram. It grossed $1,223,869 in the US by its seventh week, and £351,303 in the UK by its ninth week.

Protests in Gujarat 
In response to Khan's support for the Narmada Bachao Andolan and his criticism of Chief Minister Narendra Modi, approximately 50 activists of the Sardar Patel Group conducted protests outside of PVR and INOX theatres in Vadodara, Gujarat. The group also issued statements to all the multiplexes of Gujarat, suggesting that the film not be screened unless Khan apologised for his comments. The INOX cinema eventually boycotted the film; INOX Operations Manager Pushpendra Singh Rathod stated that "INOX is with Gujarat, and not isolated from it".

International Dyslexia Association 
The International Dyslexia Association screened Taare Zameen Par  on 29 October 2008 in Seattle, Washington. Khan noted in his official blog that there were about 200 people in the audience and that he was "curious to see the response of a non-Indian audience to what we had made." He felt some concern that Taare Zameen Par was shown in a conference room rather than a cinema hall and was projected as a DVD rather than as a film. He said that the showing concluded to an "absolutely thunderous standing ovation" which "overwhelmed" him and that he "saw the tears streaming down the cheeks of the audience." Khan also noted that the reaction to the film "was exactly as it had been with audiences back home in India".

Home media 
UTV Home Entertainment released the film on DVD in India on 25 July 2008. It was launched at Darsheel Safary's school, Green Lawns High School, in Mumbai. Aamir Khan, Tisca Chopra, Vipin Sharma, Sachet Engineer, and the rest of the cast and crew were present. In his speech, Khan stated, "Darsheel is a very happy child, full of life and vibrant. I am sure it's because of the way his parents and teachers have treated him. I must say Darsheel's principal Mrs. Bajaj has been extremely supportive and encouraging. The true test of any school is how happy the kids are and by the looks of it, the children here seem really happy."

This marked "the first time an international studio has bought the video rights of an Indian film." Retitling it Like Stars on Earth, Disney released the film in Region 2 on 26 October 2009, in Region 1 on 12 January 2010, and in Region 4 on 29 March 2010. A three-disc set, the Disney version features the original Hindi audio soundtrack with English subtitles or another dubbed in English, as well as bonus material such as audio commentary, deleted scenes, and the musical soundtrack. The film is available on Netflix.

Reception

Critical response 

Taare Zameen Par received widespread critical acclaim upon release.  Subhash K. Jha suggests that the film is "a work of art, a water painting where the colors drip into our hearts, which could easily have fallen into the motions of over-sentimentality. Aamir Khan holds back where he could easily resort to an extravagant display of drama and emotions." Rajeev Masand of CNN-IBN argued that the true power of the film lies in its "remarkable, rooted, rock-solid script which provides the landscape for such an emotionally engaging, heart-warming experience." Manish Gajjar from the BBC stated that the film "touches your heart and moves you deeply with its sterling performances. [It is] a film full of substance!" Jaspreet Pandohar, also of BBC, posited that Taare Zameen Par is a "far cry from the formulaic masala flicks churned out by the Bollywood machine," and is "an inspirational story that is as emotive as it is entertaining; this is a little twinkling star of a movie." Furthermore, Aprajita Anil of Screen gave the film four stars and stated, "Taare Zameen Par cannot be missed. Because it is different. Because it is delightful. Because it would make everyone think. Because it would help everyone grow. Because very rarely do performances get so gripping. And of course because the 'perfectionist' actor has shaped into a 'perfectionist' director." In addition, filmmaker Anurag Kashyap stated that, "Taare Zameen Par took me back to my hostel days. If you take away the dyslexia, it seems like my story. The film affected me so deeply that I was almost left speechless. After watching the film, I was asked how I liked Taare Zameen Par. I could not talk as I was deeply overwhelmed."

However, there were some criticisms. Jha's only objection to the film was Nikumbh's "sanctimonious lecture" to Ishaan's "rather theatrically-played" father. Jha found this a jarring "deviation from the delectable delicacy" of the film's tone. Although she applauded the film overall and recommended "a mandatory viewing for all schools and all parents", Nikhat Kazmi of The Times of India believed the second half was "a bit repetitive," the script needed "taut editing," and Ishaan's trauma "[seemed] a shade too prolonged and the treatment simplistic." Despite commending the "great performances" and excellent directing, Gautaman Bhaskaran of The Hollywood Reporter, too, suggested that the movie "suffers from a weak script." Likewise, Derek Kelly of Variety criticized it for what he described as its "touchy-feely-ness" attention to "a special needs kid's plight." Kelly also disliked the film for being "so resolutely caring ... and devoid of real drama and interesting characters" that "it should have 'approved by the Dyslexia Assn.' stamped on the posters."

Scholarly response 
In his article "Taare Zameen Par and dyslexic savants" featured in the Annals of Indian Academy of Neurology, Ambar Chakravarty noted the general accuracy of Ishaan's dyslexia. Though Chakravarty was puzzled by Ishaan's trouble in simple arithmetic—a trait of dyscalculia rather than dyslexia—he reasoned it was meant to "enhance the image of [Ishaan's] helplessness and disability". Labeling Ishaan an example of "dyslexic savant syndrome", he especially praised the growth of Ishaan's artistic talents after receiving help and support from Nikumbh, and deemed it the "most important (and joyous) neurocognitive phenomenon" of the film. This improvement highlights cosmetic neurology, a "major and therapeutically important issue" in cognitive neuroscience and neuropsychology.

Likewise, in their article "Wake up call from 'Stars on the Ground'" for the Indian Journal of Psychiatry, T. S. Sathyanarayana Rao and V. S. T. Krishna wrote that the film "deserves to be vastly appreciated as an earnest endeavor to portray with sensitivity and empathetically diagnose a malady in human life". They also felt it blended "modern professional knowledge" with a "humane approach" in working with a dyslexic child. However, the authors believed the film expands beyond disabilities and explores the "present age where everyone is in a restless hurry". The pair wrote, "This film raises serious questions on mental health perspectives. We seem to be heading to a state of mass scale mindlessness even as children are being pushed to 'perform'. Are we seriously getting engrossed in the race of 'achievement' and blissfully becoming numb to the crux of life i.e., experiencing meaningful living in a broader frame rather than merely existing?" The film depicts how "threats and coercion are not capable of unearthing rich human potentialities deeply embedded in children", and that teachers should instead map their strengths and weakness. With this in mind, the author felt that Khan "dexterously drives home the precise point that our first priority ought to be getting to know the child before making any efforts to fill them with knowledge and abilities". Overall, the pair found a "naive oversimplification" in the film. With India "only recently waking to recognizing the reality and tragedy of learning disability", however, they "easily [forgave the film's fault] under artistic license".

Public responses 
The film raised awareness of the issue of dyslexia, and prompted more open discussions among parents, schools, activists, and policymakers.
Anjuli Bawa, a parent-activist and founder of Action Dyslexia Delhi, said that the number of parents who visit her office increased tenfold in the months following the film's release. Many began taking a more proactive approach by contacting her after noticing problems, rather than using her as a last resort. Gupte himself received "many painful letters and phone calls" from Indian parents. He noted, "Fathers weep on the phone and say they saw the film and realized that they have been wrong in the way they treated their children. This is catharsis."

These reactions have also brought about a change in policies. The film, only ten days after its debut, influenced the Central Board of Secondary Education to provide extra time to disabled children—including visually impaired, physically disabled, and dyslexic students—during exams. In 2008, Mumbai's civic body also opened 12 classrooms for autistic students. In Chandigarh, the education administration started a course to educate teachers on how to support children with learning disabilities.

The film has had a similarly positive response in Greater China, where the film was not officially released yet has a large online cult following due to Aamir Khan's popularity in the region after the success of 3 Idiots (2009). The film has been well received by Chinese audiences for how it tackles issues such as education and dyslexia, and is one of the highest-rated films on popular Chinese film site Douban, along with two other Aamir Khan films, 3 Idiots and Dangal (2016).

Accolades 

Among its many awards, Taare Zameen Par won the Filmfare Award for Best Film for 2008, as well as the National Film Award for Best Film on Family Welfare. Khan's directorial role and Safary's performance were recognized at the 2008 Zee Cine Awards, 2008 Filmfare Awards, and 4th Apsara Film & Television Producers Guild Awards.

2009 Academy Awards submission and Slumdog Millionaire 
Taare Zameen Par was initially acclaimed as India's official entry for the 2009 Academy Awards Best Foreign Film, but after it failed to progress to the short list, a debate began in the Indian media as to why Indian films never win Academy Awards. Speculation for the reasons behind Taare Zameen Pars failed bid included Rediff.com's Arthur J. Pai's observation that it lacked mainstream media attention; AMPAS jury member Krishna Shah criticized its length and abundance of songs.

Khan claimed that he was "not surprised"  that Taare Zameen Par was not included in the Academy Award shortlist, and argued, "I don't make films for awards. I make films for the audience. The audience, for which I have made the film, really loved it and the audiences outside India have also loved it. What I am trying to say is that film has been well loved across the globe and that for me it is extremely heartening and something that I give very high value to."

The Indian news media also frequently compared Taare Zameen Par's nomination failure with the British drama film Slumdog Millionaires multiple Academy Award nominations and wins, and noted that other Indian films in the past were overlooked. Film critic Rajeev Masand argued that it is difficult to compare the two films and noted that Slumdog Millionaire was being marketed in a way that Indian films such as Taare Zameen Par could not compete with. In this context, Slumdog Millionaire actor Mahesh Manjrekar stated, "I'm sad that Aamir's Taare Zameen Par didn't make it to the final round of the Oscars. I thought it to be way better than Slumdog [Millionaire]..., without taking away anything from Boyle and the kids. But, Indian movies are underestimated there."

Soundtrack 

The soundtrack for Taare Zameen Par was released on 4 November 2007 under the label T-Series. The music is mainly composed by Shankar–Ehsaan–Loy, with lyrics by Prasoon Joshi. However, "Mera Jahan" was scored by Shailendra Barve and written by Gupte. Joshi received the National Film Award for Best Lyrics, and Shankar Mahadevan won the National Film Award for Best Male Playback Singer, both for "Maa."

Track listing

Reception 

Joginder Tuteja of Bollywood Hungama praised the variety of genres present in the soundtrack and the lack of remixes. He gave it an overall rating of 3.5 out of 5 stars, calling it a "zero compromise album" that "stays true to the film's spirit". Planet Bollywood's Atta Khan rated it 9 out of 10, noting that the soundtrack "unquestionably lives up to all expectations". He felt that it maintained an "all round polished nature" and "is destined to become a classic". Although he, too, enjoyed the musical variety, he believed the composers overused the guitar and synthesizers. Sukanya Verma of Rediff.com gave the soundtrack a score of 3 out of 5, commenting, "Taare Zameen Par isn't your regular soundtrack about fluttering hearts and sleepless nights. What makes these delicate and whimsical creations special is their underlying innocence." According to the Indian trade website Box Office India, with around  units sold, this film's soundtrack album was the year's thirteenth highest-selling.

See also 

List of artistic depictions of dyslexia
 List of Indian submissions for the Academy Award for Best Foreign Language Film
 List of submissions to the 81st Academy Awards for Best Foreign Language Film

References

Further reading

External links 

 
 
 
 
 

2000s educational films
2000s Hindi-language films
2007 films
Best Film on Family Welfare National Film Award winners
2000s children's drama films
2000s psychological drama films
Dyslexia in fiction
Films about disability in India
Films about fictional painters
Films about the education system in India
Films scored by Shankar–Ehsaan–Loy
Films set in Mumbai
Films shot in Mumbai
Indian children's drama films
Indian psychological drama films
Indian films with live action and animation
2007 directorial debut films
Disney India films
Films set in boarding schools
Films about educators
Films about students
Films about teacher–student relationships
Films about special education
Films set in 2006
Films set in 2007